Zinaid (Miki) Memišević (zi'naid 'miki me'miʃevit͡ʃ; 26 April 1950 – 7 January 2023) was a Bosnian and Serbian theatre and film actor. Born in 1950 in Sarajevo, he lived and worked in Vancouver, Canada.

Career 
Memišević's first appearance on film in 1966 (Konjuh planinom) in a small role of a young boy, sparked his dream to become an actor and started a successful acting career. After graduating from the Academy of Dramatic Arts of the University of Belgrade in 1973, he became a permanent member of the company at the National Theatre in Belgrade and appeared on stage in numerous plays. He also played roles in many films and TV series that were produced in Yugoslavia during the 1980s and 1990s.

Following the breakup of Yugoslavia, he moved to Canada in 1994 with his family and continued his career there, appearing in several films and TV series.
He "gave Hollywood's best-known portrayal" of Viktor Tikhonov, a Soviet ice hockey player and coach, in Miracle (2004) and appeared in cameos as the President Sergey Makarenko in 2012 (2009).

Memišević had roles in television films The Building (2009, dir. Terry Ingram), Ronnie and Julie (1997, dir. Philip Spink), and in a short film Henry's Café (1998, dir. Ted Bortolin, Geoff Denham). He also appeared in several episodes of various TV series, such as The X-Files (1996), Da Vinci's Inquest (2000 and 2002), and Jake 2.0 (2003).

In 2009 he was nominated for a Leo Award for the Best Performance by a Male in a Short Drama category for his role in the film Pappy and Speedster (2009, dir. Brae Norwiss).

Memišević played a significant role in Neworld Theatre and Touchstone Theatre's production of Wajdi Mouawad's play Tideline (2007), in which he appeared together with his daughter, Una Memišević, who is also an actress.

Memišević died on 7 January 2023, at the age of 72.

Filmography

Film

Television

References

External links
 
 "Tideline" (Preview). Vancouverplays Theatre, v.40 (October 2007). Retrieved 29 December 2014. http://www.vancouverplays.com/theatre/previews_theatre/preview_tideline_2007.shtml

1950 births
2023 deaths
Male actors from Sarajevo
Bosnia and Herzegovina male film actors
Bosnia and Herzegovina male stage actors
Serbian male film actors
University of Belgrade Faculty of Dramatic Arts alumni